Cairn O' Mounth/Cairn O' Mount is a high mountain pass in Aberdeenshire, Scotland. The place name is a survival of the ancient name for what are now the Grampian Mountains, earlier called "the Mounth" (in Gaelic: "monadh", meaning mountains). The name change happened from circa 1520 AD. The Ordnance Survey shows the name as Cairn o' Mount.

It has served as an ancient military route at least from Roman times through the 13th century AD.  The alignment of the Cairnamounth, Elsick Mounth and Causey Mounth ancient trackways had a strong influence on the medieval siting of many fortifications and other settlements in the area comprised by present-day Aberdeenshire on both sides of the River Dee.

Geography

Cairn O' Mounth is at 1493 feet (454 m) above mean sea level, and there are various commanding views of the surrounding landscape which extend as far as the North Sea.

Before the modern A90 road was constructed, the pass served as one of the eight major crossing points for those travelling over the Grampians to Deeside and into Northern Scotland; this entire crossing trackway is historically known as the Cairnamounth. Deriving from this theory, a small village grew up in the pass.  The high granite tor of Clachnaben overlooks the road (now called the B974 road) through the pass. The Scottish Tourist Board describes the modern B974 as an "adventurous" road, and it is often impassable due to snow or flooding in winter.

History
In the 11th century AD, Mac Bethad (commonly known as Macbeth) survived the original English invasion, for he was defeated and mortally wounded or killed by Máel Coluim mac Donnchada on the north side of the Mounth in 1057, after retreating with his men over the Cairnamounth Pass to take his last stand at the battle at Lumphanan. The Prophecy of Berchán has it that he was wounded and died at Scone, sixty miles to the south, some days later. Mac Bethad's stepson Lulach mac Gille Coemgáin was installed as king soon after.

The Cairn O'Mounth pass was used by Edward I's English army in 1296 AD, en route back to England. It was also used twice by Viscount Dundee's army during the first Jacobite rising of 1689. The route over the pass is probably prehistoric: there is a cairn in the pass that has been dated to approximately 2000 BC. It is possible that this cairn is the one named in the name of Cairn O'Mounth.

See also
Causey Mounth
Elsick Mounth

Line notes

References

 Scottish Mountaineering Club, Scottish Mountaineering Club Journal, 1920
 William Forbes Skene, Chronicles of the Picts, Chronicles of the Scots, and Other Early Memorials, 1867, H. M. General Register, Scotland, 499 pages

Mountain passes of Scotland
Transport in Aberdeenshire
Kincardine and Mearns
Landforms of Aberdeenshire